Downtown Denver is the main financial, commercial, business, and entertainment district in Denver, Colorado.
The downtown area consists mostly of the neighborhoods of Union Station and Central Business District. LoDo and RiNo are notable districts within downtown. Some of the more popular specific attractions include the 16th Street pedestrian mall, Larimer Square, the re-emerging Theatre District near Curtis and 14th, and Civic Center Park. Surrounding neighborhoods include Capitol Hill and Uptown to the east, Highland to the west, Five Points to the north, and the Golden Triangle to the south.

Overview 

This count does not include the recently completed One Lincoln Park or the Spire and the Four Seasons both under construction. See the List of tallest buildings in Denver.

Entertainment 

Denver has made a strong effort to centralize its commercial and entertainment interests in the Downtown area.  Currently, it is home to both Coors Field and Ball Arena, and roughly a mile from nearby Empower Field at Mile High.  LoDo and the 16th Street mall are home to hundreds of bars, restaurants, and cafes, attracting many residents from the metro area and supporting the 10,000 plus residents living in the central business district.  Additionally, Downtown Denver is home to the second largest Performing Arts Center in the United States.

Federal District 
Downtown Denver also houses a smaller Federal District consisting of four blocks around Champa, Stout, 19th and 20th streets.  This district contains a federal courthouse, the Byron G. Rogers Federal Building, a U.S. Court of Appeals, and a US Customs House.

Economy
Occidental Petroleum operates its Denver office in the Granite Tower in Downtown Denver.

"Urban camping" ban
The Downtown Denver Partnership helped lead the lobbying effort to pass an ordinance that provided the police with a law enforcement tool to move the homeless out of sight of tourists and residents of downtown Denver. Support for the "Urban Camping" Ban included hotelier Walter Isenberg, Vice Chair of a Downtown Denver Partnership board and major donor to Denver's Road Home, the city agency on homelessness. The ban, now Sec. 38-86.2. of the Denver Municipal Code, passed on May 14, 2012 and supersedes Sec. 38-86.1. which provided the homeless a safe sanctuary in downtown Denver between the hours of 9:00 p.m. and 7:00 a.m. Sponsored by Mayor Michael Hancock and Councilman Albus Brooks, the ban was approved by a vote of 9 to 4 by the Denver City Council. A number of organizations are opposing the ban criminalizing homelessness including Colorado Coalition for the Homeless, Denver Catholic Worker, Denver Homeless Out Loud, Downtown Denver  and Occupy Denver. Denver Homeless Out Loud compiled a report on the impact of the "Urban Camping" Ban after surveying 512 homeless people.

References 

Neighborhoods in Denver
Denver